Sammul Chan Kin-fung (born 4 May 1978) is from Hong Kong. He is an actor, singer, and presenter.

Career
Chan debuted in 1999 as a DJ for Metro Broadcast Corporation Limited under his birth name, although most of the time he was simply referred to and credited as simply "Sammul". From 1999, he has signed with three record labels to release albums, but all were not successful. He record a full-length Mandarin album in Taiwan, but the label failed.

In 1999, after signing a management contract with Ivy Entertainment and a filming contract with TVB, he began to officially use the Chinese stage name Chan Kin-fung and began filming television dramas. He later gained recognition as the ambitious young lawyer Vincent in the 2003 TVB drama Survivor's Law and received further popularity through his role as Donald in Triumph in the Skies, a ratings hit.

Filmography

Film

Television dramas

Music
"Contact Lense Hero" (隱形眼鏡俠)
"Spinning" (旋旋轉)
"Surrounded" (左擁右抱)
"Same Space" (同等的空間)
"Saving This Moment" (留住這時光)
"Bicycle" (單車) – originally by Eason Chan 
"The Stronger, the Braver" (愈強越勇) – Olympic Six Stars
"My Pride" (我的驕傲) – Olympic Six Stars
"Riding Winds, Plowing Waves" (乘風破浪) – Olympic Six Stars 
"Suddenly" (來去豁然) – Olympic Six Stars 
"Clicked You" (CLICK中你)
"New Friend" (新朋友)
"Strong" (強) – The Academy (學警雄心) Sub-theme, originally by Aaron Kwok 
"Child, Let Me Love" (孩子‧讓我愛) – New Born (天地孩兒) theme song
"True Hero" (真心英雄) – Guts of Man (肝膽崑崙) theme song 
"Unwilling" (捨不得) 
"Storm" (風暴) – The Four (少年四大名捕) theme song, with Raymond Lam, Ron Ng, Kenneth Ma
"Black and White Variation" (黑白變奏) – EU (學警狙擊) theme song, with Ron Ng and Michael Tse
"Legalized Bride Theft" (合法搶親) – A Bride for a Ride (王老虎搶親) theme song, with Chin Kar-lok and Wong Cho Lam
"Loving You Is My Happiness" (愛你就是我的幸福) – Yan Yu Xie Yang (煙雨斜陽) theme song
"Seeing the best of you in the worst times"(最坏时候遇上最好的你) – "feng huo jia ren" （烽火佳人）theme song
"Together with you" (与你同在) – "tong mou zhe" (同谋者) theme song, with RegenC

Awards
TVB Anniversary Awards
Most Improved Actor -- nominee for Bar Benders, Maiden's Vow (2006)
Best Supporting Actor -- nominee for Maiden's Vow (2006)
Most Improved Actor -- nominee for The Academy, Wong Fei Hung: Master of Kung Fu (2005)

References

External links
Sammul Chan on Sina Blog
Sammul Chan on Instagram
Sammul Chan on Fyuse

1978 births
Living people
Hong Kong male film actors
Hong Kong male singers
Hong Kong male television actors
Hong Kong television presenters
TVB actors
20th-century Hong Kong male actors
21st-century Hong Kong male actors